A. Visanio Johnson (born March 10, 1941) is an American politician. He served as a Democratic member for the 98th and 99th district of the Oklahoma House of Representatives.

Life and career 
Johnson attended Oklahoma City University. He was an attorney.

In 1967, Johnson was elected to represent the 98th district of the Oklahoma House of Representatives, succeeding John B. White. In the same year, he marched along with Archibald B. Hill and E. Melvin Porter against the delay of an open housing law that would have help end racial discrimination in housing. He served until 1973, when he was succeeded by Thomas Duckett. In the same year, he was elected to represent the 99th district, succeeding Hill. He served until 1981, when he was succeeded by Freddye Harper Williams.

References 

1941 births
Living people
Democratic Party members of the Oklahoma House of Representatives
20th-century American politicians
20th-century Members of the Oklahoma House of Representatives
Oklahoma City University alumni
20th-century African-American politicians